This is the discography of Canadian rap rock/alternative rock band, Down with Webster. The band has sold over 50,000 albums and 500,000 singles.

Albums

Studio albums

Extended plays

Singles

Promotional singles

Other charted songs

Guest appearances

Music videos

Notes

References

Discographies of Canadian artists